Salerno railway station serves the Italian city of Salerno and was opened in 1866. It is the main railway station of the city.

Overview
It is located at the junction of several lines, including two major national lines, the Naples–Salerno line and the Salerno–Reggio Calabria line. It is also served by the to Mercato San Severino. In addition, it is served by regional trains operating over the old Salerno–Nocera Inferiore via Cava de' Tirreni line, which was part of the Naples–Salerno line before the construction of the Santa Lucia tunnel.

Gallery

Train connections
Salerno station is an important hub for regional and long-distance trains within the national territory. It is served by several high speed trains, InterCity and Express services, linking it to almost all the main Italian cities. Starting from 4 November 2013 the station is also served by a suburban railway named "Metro Salerno", linking it to the city's eastern suburb, for which it has been projected a western expansion and a future link to Salerno-Pontecagnano Airport.

The following trains call at this station: (incomplete)

High speed trains (Frecciarossa) Turin - Milan - Bologna - Florence - Rome - Naples - Salerno
High speed trains (Frecciargento) Rome - Naples - Salerno - Lamezia Terme - Reggio Calabria
High speed trains (Frecciabianca) Rome - Naples - Salerno - Sapri - Lamezia - Vibo Valentia - Reggio Calabria
High speed trains (Italo) Turin - Milan - Bologna - Florence - Rome - Naples - Salerno
High speed trains (Italo) Venice - Padua - Bologna - Florence - Rome - Naples - Salerno
Intercity trains Rome - Naples - Salerno - Taranto
Night train (Intercity Notte) Turin - Milan - Bologna - Florence - Rome - Naples - Salerno - Lamezia Terme - Reggio di Calabria
Regional trains (Treno regionale) Naples - Salerno - Potenza - Metaponto - Taranto

See also

Salerno metropolitan railway service
History of rail transport in Italy
List of railway stations in Campania
Rail transport in Italy
Railway stations in Italy

Notes and references

External links

Railway stations in Campania
Railway station
Railway stations opened in 1866
1866 establishments in Italy
Railway stations in Italy opened in the 19th century